Atlatlia is a genus of flies in the family Dolichopodidae. It contains two species, both of which are found in Australia. The name of the genus is derived from "atlatl", the Nahuatl word for "spear-thrower".

Species 
 Atlatlia flaviseta Bickel, 1986 – Western Australia
 Atlatlia girsea Bickel, 1986 – New South Wales

References 

Medeterinae
Dolichopodidae genera
Diptera of Australasia